Rafael Sánchez Navarro (born 1958) is a Spanish-Mexican actor. He is the son of Manolo Fábregas, an actor from Spain who established himself in Mexico. Sanchez Navarro is also the cousin of Manuel Sánchez Navarro, who in turn is the son of Fábregas' sister, famous actress Viviana Fábregas, his aunt.

Biography
Growing up along many famous people, Sanchez Navarro was introduced to show business world early on. He got used to nights spent at the television and film studios, interviews, and seeing his relatives on television much of the time, among other things.

Sanchez Navarro decided from very early in his life that he wanted to follow in his father's footsteps. At the age of twenty-two, Navarro found a job with Televisa – playing a supporting role in the Secretos de Confesion (Secrets to Confess) telenovela. He did not work in telenovelas again until 1982's Por Amor (For love). In 1983, he participated in four telenovelas, Manana es Primavera, (Tomorrow it Will be Spring), Cuarteto Para el fin del Tiempo (A Quartet Until the End), Bodas de Odio (Hate Wedding), and Cazador de Demonios (Demon Hunter as Jose Luis).

He played Orson, feature character, in 1988's El pecado de Oyuki, (Oyuki's Sin).

He participated in only one episode of 1989's Cita con la Muerte (Date with Death), and then he made small roles in three more soap operas, before playing Adolfo Degollado in 1991's, El Teatro del Horror (Horror Theatre). He followed that up by playing Rodolfo Olmedo in 1992's Lo Blanco y lo Negro (Black and White), and Renato in 1993s Valentina, another hit telenovela.

Sanchez Navarro reached celebrity status when he played Santiago Ugalde, a criminal millionaire and show business representative, in 1994's Volver a empezar. In Volver A Empezar, he participated alongside Yuri (who played Santiago's" girlfriend), Chayanne, Eduardo Changerotti and Guillermo García Cantú, among others.

Volver A Empezar became such a major hit, that it even spawned a soundtrack CD, where Chayanne, Yuri and Changerotti sang. The soap opera gave Sanchez Navarro fame in places such as Argentina, Puerto Rico, the United States, Israel and Russia.

Suddenly a star, Sanchez Navarro was lured by an economical offer to move to Televisa's rival, buddying TV Azteca. He became one of that network's first bonafide celebrities when he signed a contract with the channel, and, towards the end of 1994, he recorded Peor es Nada, which was also seen in Hong Kong, with the name Better Than Nothing.

Filmography 
 
|2018
| Enemigo Intimo 
|Borges

External links

New York Times – Rafael Sanchez Navarro filmography

1958 births
Living people
Mexican male telenovela actors
Spanish male telenovela actors
Mexican people of Spanish descent
Mexican people of German descent